Huh Tae-soo (born November 8, 1957) is the chairman of GS Group. Huh has a degree in Jurisprudence from Korea University and attended an MBA course at George Washington University in the United States.

Huh became chairman of GS Group in 2020 and he has been chairman of FC Seoul since 2020.

References

External links
 GS Group Official Website - Chairman Profile Page 

1957 births
Living people
George Washington University alumni
South Korean businesspeople
South Korean billionaires
GS Group
Chairmen and investors of football clubs in South Korea 
FC Seoul directors and chairmen
South Korean football chairmen and investors
Gimhae Heo clan
People from Busan